This article is intended to give an overview of banking in Austria.

Banking system

Regulations 
Since the introduction of the Kreditwesensgesetz (KWG) in 1979, the boundaries between the various types of credit institutions have gradually become blurred. Many banks have developed into universal banks offering a comprehensive range of banking services. Prior to the 1979 KWG, the Austrian banking system was still governed by the Kreditwesengesetz, which had been in force since October 1, 1938 in Nazi Germany and the associated Austria. The 1979 KWG was created as a result of the increasing liberalization of the banking system and the general trend towards universal banks. The rapid growth and increased activity of Austrian banks abroad made it necessary to adapt to international standards, which was regulated in the 1986 amendment to the law. On January 1, 1994, the KWG was replaced by the new Banking Act (Bankwesensgesetz- BWG), which was drafted in view of EU conformity and also contains improved provisions for creditor and consumer protection. In 2002, the Austrian Financial Market Authority (FMA) was founded, which supervises the Austrian banking sector. Due to the economic interest in a stable financial sector, financial market participants, the financial market infrastructure (stock exchange, securities depository) and securities trading are subject to state supervision.

Oesterreichische Nationalbank and Oesterreichische Kontrollbank 
The Oesterreichische Nationalbank, Austria's central bank, was founded in 1816. 

Great importance is attached in Austria to the Oesterreichische Kontrollbank Aktiengesellschaft (OeKB). It is Austria's central financial and information service provider for the export industry and the capital market. Its services are available to companies and financial institutions as well as institutions of the Republic of Austria. The services of OeKB include Export Services, Capital Market Services for stock exchanges, issuers, financial service providers and investors as well as Energy Market Services for the electricity and gas market. Furthermore, OeKB is a sought-after issuer on the international bond market.

Largest banks in Austria 
The largest Austrian credit institutions by balance sheet total in 2018

Notable bankers in Austria 
The following former and current bankers have made an important contribution to the development of the Austrian banking industry and continue to develop it in their position as CEO:

 Gerhard Randa: long-standing CEO Unicredit Bank Austria; CEO of Sberbank Europe AG
 Andreas Mitterlehner: General Director of Hypo Landesbank Upper Austria for 16 years
 Peter Bosek long-standing Chairman of the Management Board of Erste Bank and Member of the Management Board of Erste Bank Groupe
 Helmut Hardt: long-standing member of the Management Board and also CEO of Wiener Privatbank SE
 Ludwig Scharinger: he was from 1985 to 2012 General Director and Chairman of the Board of Raiffeisenlandesbank Oberösterreich
 Alfred Reiter: Member of the Management Board of Investkredit Bank AG from 1976-2001, also their Chairman and for the last 7 years also active as General Manager.
 Erwin Hameseder: former chairmen of the Board and General Manager of RLB NÖ-Wien. Since 2012 Chairman of Raiffeisen-Holding NÖ-Wien
 Andreas Treichl: long-term CEO of Erste Bank, 2008 to 2020 CEO of Erste Group Bank AG 
 Robert Ulm: CEO of Hello bank!, more than 20 years of experience in the Austrian financial industry and online brokerage.
 Robert Zadrazil: CEO of Bank-Austria since 2016 and President of the Association of Austrian Banks and Bankers.
 Gerda Holzinger-Burgstaller: will be the new CEO of Erste Bank Austria in 2021, also acting as CFO and COO
 Heinrich Schaller: Chairman of the Board of Raiffeisenlandesbank Oberösterreich AG and General Director of RLB
 Igor Strehl: long-standing CEO of VTB Bank (Austria) AG (former Donau Bank AG) and a board member of Sberbank Europe AG (former Volksbank International AG)
 Erich Hampel
 Anas Abuzaakouk: CEO for BAWAG Group AG and Chairman-Management Board & CEO for BAWAG P.S.K. AG (a subsidiary of BAWAG Group AG). He is also on the board of easybank AG.

Stock exchange
A special decree of Empress Maria Theresa (August 1, 1771) provided for the establishment of a stock exchange in Vienna. From the mid-19th century to the beginning of World War I, it was the main capital market of middle and eastern Europe, and from 1918 to 1938, it had continuous international importance as an equity market for the newly founded nations originating from the former monarchy. The exchange also deals in five Austrian and seven foreign investment certificates. The Austrian Traded Index has grown steadily in the past few years, growing 8.71% in 2002, and
averaging a growth rate of 10.15% in the past five years. Market capitalization as of December 2004 stood at $85.815 billion, with the index up 57.4% at 2,431.4 from the previous year. There were 99 companies listed on the Wiener Börse AG in 2004.

References